Daryl Peter Earl Gibson (born 2 March 1975) is an international rugby coach and former New Zealand rugby union footballer. He played for the Crusaders in the Super Rugby and represented his country with the All Blacks. After success as assistant coach with the Waratahs side when they won the 2014 Super Rugby Championship, Gibson replaced Michael Cheika as head Coach of the team in 2015.

Early life 
Gibson was born in Lumsden, New Zealand and grew up in Te Anau, before shifting to Christchurch where he attended Christchurch Boys High School.

Playing career 
Gibson played for Canterbury and The Crusaders from 1993 to 2002 where he made a combined 168 appearances for the team that went on to win four Super Rugby crowns during that time. The internationally renowned centre also earned 19 caps for the New Zealand All Blacks. Between 1996 and 2001, Gibson represented New Zealand Māori 12 times.

Moving to the northern hemisphere Gibson played for Bristol Bears (21 caps), Leicester Tigers (92 caps) and Glasgow Warriors (18 caps) before moving into coaching.

Coaching career 
Gibson started his coaching career as a player and part-time backs coach with Glasgow Warriors, while in Glasgow, Gibson welcomed the arrival of his triplets  Indy, Oscar and Finley.

Crusaders
In 2008 he returned home to his former Club the Canterbury Crusaders, this time as the Assistant Coach from 2008 to 2012. During Gibson's time the Crusaders progressed through to the semi final on four occasions and finished runners up in 2011, after an incredible year where the team played no home games because of the Christchurch earthquakes.

Gibson was also the Assistant Coach to the national Maori All Blacks side during 2010–2012. Alongside Head Coach Jamie Joseph. In 2010, the centenary series of 100 years of Maori rugby, the team had successful games against visiting teams Ireland and England.

NSW Waratahs
Moving to Sydney in 2013, Gibson joined the NSW Waratahs. His first 2 seasons were transition years as the team roster welcomed a host of young players as established players departed overseas. In 2018, Gibson lead the Waratahs to the semi finals vs the Lions. In 2019 a promising start to the season was overshadowed by events surrounding star player Israel Folau.

Education 
Gibson is a qualified Physical Education teacher, has degrees in Commerce and Education. Gibson is currently completing his second master's degree. His research at Sydney University with his thesis entitled: "Coach Approach through losing streaks". It examines how the elite coaches in Australian Football League (AFL), National Rugby League (NRL) and Rugby Union, lead their teams through challenging situations of losing.

His education qualifications include:
Masters of Education with Distinction (MEd Dist) (University of Canterbury), Bachelor of Commerce (B.Com.) (University of Canterbury), Bachelor of Education (BEd Phys Ed) (University of Canterbury), Diploma of Teaching (Dip. TCH) (Christchurch College of Education)

Family 
Gibson has four children. Poppy, Indy, Oscar and Finley Gibson

See also 
 High School Old Boys RFC

References

External links 
 Crusaders profile 
 New Waratahs coach Daryl Gibson steeled for any challenge after avoiding family tragedy 
 Gibson to be third Crusaders Coach
 Daryl Gibson signs with Waratahs 2]
 Gibson departs NSW Waratahs
 Daryl Gibson interview
 Glasgow profile
 

1975 births
New Zealand international rugby union players
Bristol Bears players
Canterbury rugby union players
Crusaders (rugby union) players
People educated at Christchurch Boys' High School
Glasgow Warriors players
Leicester Tigers players
Living people
New Zealand rugby union players
People from Lumsden, New Zealand
Expatriate rugby union players in Scotland
New Zealand expatriate sportspeople in England
New Zealand expatriate sportspeople in Scotland
Christchurch College of Education alumni
Rugby union centres